Brian Pinho (born May 11, 1995) is an American professional ice hockey center currently playing for the Utica Comets in the American Hockey League (AHL) while under contract to the New Jersey Devils of the National Hockey League (NHL). He was drafted 174th overall, in the sixth round of the 2013 NHL Entry Draft by the Washington Capitals.

Playing career
Pinho played college hockey for the Providence Friars and was part of the team that won the 2015 NCAA Division I Men's Ice Hockey Tournament. He made his NHL debut on August 16, 2020, in a Stanley Cup playoffs game against the New York Islanders.

On September 17, 2020, the Capitals signed Pinho to a two-year contract extension.

As a free agent from the Capitals, Pinho was signed one-year, two-way contract with the New Jersey Devils on July 13, 2022.

Career statistics

References

External links
 

1995 births
Living people
American ice hockey centers
American people of Portuguese descent
Hershey Bears players
Ice hockey players from Massachusetts
Indiana Ice players
Providence Friars men's ice hockey players
Utica Comets players
Washington Capitals draft picks
Washington Capitals players